The Our Lady of Peace Cathedral (Also simply called Cathedral of Our Lady) is the catholic cathedral of N'Djamena, capital of Chad and seat of the Archdiocese of N'Djamena (Archidioecesis Ndiamenana or L'archidiocèse de N'Djaména). It is located near the Charles de Gaulle Avenue and Avenue Félix Éboué. It was built and inaugurated in 1965 and destroyed on April 21, 1980, during the Civil War. In fact, the city suffered great destruction in 1979 and especially in 1980, when the conflict developed commonly called the war "Tizah chuhur". The current building, which occupies most of the old structures, was rebuilt between 1983 and 1986. In 2013 it was restored again.

See also
Roman Catholicism in Chad
Our Lady of Peace Cathedral

References

Roman Catholic cathedrals in Chad
Buildings and structures in N'Djamena
Roman Catholic churches completed in 1965
20th-century Roman Catholic church buildings